Jack Kirkwood (August 6, 1894 – August 2, 1964) was a Scottish-American actor, comedian and vaudevillian. He was known for playing the role of Charley Hackett in the American sitcom television series One Happy Family.

Kirkwood was born in Scotland. He began his career in vaudeville before appearing on radio in the 1930s, presenting KFRC's radio show Breakfast Club. Kirkwood also starred in his own radio show titled The Jack Kirkwood Show. In 1950 he starred in the film Fancy Pants in the role of Mike Floud.

His last television credit was in the NBC sitcom television series One Happy Family. Kirkwood died in August 1964 of a heart attack at his home in Las Vegas, Nevada, at the age of 69. He was buried in Palm Downtown Cemetery.

References

External links 

Rotten Tomatoes profile

1894 births
1964 deaths
Scottish male film actors
Scottish male television actors
Scottish male comedians
Scottish male radio actors
American male film actors
American male television actors
American male comedians
American male radio actors
20th-century Scottish male actors
20th-century American male actors
Vaudeville performers
British emigrants to the United States
20th-century Scottish comedians
20th-century American comedians